The New New Thing: A Silicon Valley Story is a book by Michael M. Lewis published in 1999 by W. W. Norton & Company.

Synopsis
The book is written with a comedic touch similar to that of the Lewis's earlier book Liar's Poker. The book focuses on the founder of several Silicon Valley companies, James H. Clark, and the entrepreneurial culture that dominated the area during the height of the Internet boom.

Recognition
It was named one of the best books of 1999 by BusinessWeek, Christian Science Monitor, St. Louis Post-Dispatch, and The Industry Standard.

References

External links
The New New Thing: A Silicon Valley Story (book details) - The Official Michael Lewis website

Business books
Books by Michael Lewis
1999 non-fiction books
W. W. Norton & Company books